Lieutenant-Colonel James Algernon Stevens CIE OBE VD (2 October 1873 – 11 December 1934) was a British customs officer in India.

The son of Sir John Stevens of the Indian Civil Service, Stevens was educated at Blundell's School and Corpus Christi College, Cambridge. He joined the Indian Police Service in 1898, but transferred to the Indian Customs Service in 1906. From 1913 to 1921, he served as Chief Collector of Customs in Burma and from 1921 he was Collector of Customs in Bombay. While in Rangoon, he commanded the 18th (Rangoon) Battalion of the Indian Defence Force.

He was appointed Officer of the Order of the British Empire (OBE) in 1919 and Companion of the Order of the Indian Empire (CIE) in the 1920 New Year Honours.

Footnotes

References
Who Was Who

1873 births
1934 deaths
People educated at Blundell's School
Alumni of Corpus Christi College, Cambridge
British colonial police officers
Indian Police Service officers in British India
Indian Customs Service officers
Administrators in British Burma
Indian Defence Force officers
Companions of the Order of the Indian Empire
Officers of the Order of the British Empire